Abu'l-Ala Ganjavi or Abul'alā-ye Ganje'i was a poet of the 12th century at the court of the Shirvanshahs. He is also known as the "Master of Poets", for he became the master in poetry of Khaqani, introducing him to the court of Khaqan Manuchehr Shirvanshah, as well as of Falaki.

References

Sources

 
 
 
 
 
 

12th-century poets
Persian poetry
Poets of the Shirvanshahs